The 1979-80 2nd Bundesliga season was the seventh season of the 2nd Bundesliga, the second level of ice hockey in Germany. Twelve teams participated in the league, and ESV Kaufbeuren  won the championship, and was promoted to the Ice hockey Bundesliga as a result. EHC 70 München was also promoted for finishing second. Herner EV and EC Regensburg were relegated to the Oberliga.

Regular season

References

External links
Season on hockeyarchives.info

2nd Bundesliga (ice hockey) seasons
2